Alexander Ritschard (born March 24, 1994) is a Swiss–American tennis player. He has a career high ATP singles ranking of World No. 163 achieved on 12 September 2022. He also has a career high ATP doubles ranking of World No. 388 achieved on 4 April 2022.

Career
Ritschard made his ATP main draw debut at the 2013 Crédit Agricole Suisse Open Gstaad in the doubles draw partnering Alexander Sadecky.

At the age of 28 he made his Grand Slam and ATP debut in singles after qualifying for the 2022 Wimbledon Championships. He drew fourth seeded Stefanos Tsitsipas whom despite his ranking, performed very poorly on grass, having lost in the first round of his two previous Wimbledon appearances. Ritschard stormed out to a 4-1 lead in the first set, on serve, looking like another possible upset but Tsitsipas rallied to win the set in a tiebreaker and the match in four sets.

At the 2022 Swiss Open Gstaad he won his maiden ATP tour match defeating eight seed Joao Sousa as a wildcard.

He made his debut at the US Open as a qualifier.

He won his Maiden Challenger title in Hamburg, defeating Henri Laaksonen, after the fellow Swiss retired in the second set when Ritschard was 7-5 6-5 up and had 40-30 on his service game, climbing 50 positions back to No. 166 in the singles rankings on 24 October 2022.

Personal life
Ritschard attended the University of Virginia, graduating in 2017. He took an Arts Administration class with the iconic George Sampson.

In April 2018, Ritschard started representing the United States. On 28 February 2022, he decided to once again represent Switzerland.

Challenger and Futures/World Tennis Tour finals

Singles: 10 (6–4)

References

External links
 
 
 

1994 births
Living people
Swiss male tennis players
Tennis players from Zürich
American male tennis players
Virginia Cavaliers men's tennis players
American people of Swiss descent